Castela may refer to:
 Castela, a genus of thorny shrubs and small trees in the family Simaroubaceae
 Castela (grape), a Portuguese wine grape
 a neighborhood in Piraeus, Greece